Ilya Ivanovich Garkavyi (1888–1937) was a Soviet komkor (corps commander) and organizer of Red Guards detachments in Tiraspol.

He fought in the Imperial Russian Army during World War I before going over to the Bolsheviks in the subsequent Civil War. He was a recipient of the Order of the Red Banner. During the Great Purge, he was arrested on March 11, 1937 alongside fellow komkor Matvei Vasilenko. Both were later executed.

Bibliography

Sources
 БСЭ
 74-я Краснознаменная Нижнеднепровская гвардейская стрелковая дивизия

1888 births
1937 deaths
People from Yekaterinoslav Governorate
People from Dnipropetrovsk Oblast
Members of the All-Ukrainian Central Executive Committee
Ukrainian people of World War I
Russian military personnel of World War I
Soviet military personnel of the Russian Civil War
Garkavyi
Recipients of the Order of the Red Banner
Great Purge victims from Ukraine
People executed by the Soviet Union